The World's End is a 2013 science fiction comedy film directed by Edgar Wright from a screenplay by Wright and Simon Pegg. It is the third and final installment in the Three Flavours Cornetto trilogy, after Shaun of the Dead (2004) and Hot Fuzz (2007). It stars Pegg, Nick Frost, Paddy Considine, Martin Freeman, Eddie Marsan, Rosamund Pike, and Pierce Brosnan. In the film, five friends return to their hometown to reattempt a pub crawl they failed twenty-three years earlier, only to discover the town is in the midst of an alien invasion.

The film entered initial development in 1995 after Wright wrote a screenplay titled Crawl about teenagers on a pub crawl; after deciding it was better suited as a comedic exploration of young adulthood and aging, he reworked the screenplay with Pegg in the early 2010s. The film was produced by Relativity Media, Big Talk Productions, and Working Title Films. Principal photography began on 28 September 2012 and lasted until that December, with filming locations including Elstree Studios, Letchworth Garden City, and Welwyn Garden City. The film's stunts were coordinated by members of Jackie Chan Stunt Team, and The World's End is considered a social science fiction film.

The World's End premiered at Leicester Square in London on 10 July 2013, and was first theatrically released in the United Kingdom by Universal Pictures nine days later. It was later released in the United States by Focus Features on 23 August. The film received positive reviews from critics, with praise for the screenplay, performances of the cast, humour, and Wright's direction. It won Best British Film at the 19th Empire Awards, and was nominated for Best Comedy at the 19th Critics' Choice Awards. The World's End was also a commercial success, grossing $46.1 million worldwide.

Plot 
Gary King, an immature 40-year-old alcoholic, decides to recapture his youth by contacting his boyhood friends Oliver Chamberlain, Peter Page, Steven Prince, and Andrew Knightley and inviting them to complete the Golden Mile, a pub crawl encompassing the 12 pubs of their hometown of Newton Haven, the last of them being the World's End. The group attempted the crawl as teens in 1990, but failed to reach the final three pubs. Andy, now a teetotaller due to a drunk driving accident years before involving himself and Gary, reluctantly agrees to join after Gary tells him that his mother died.

The group encounters Oliver's sister, Sam, over whom Gary and Steven fought in school; during the teenage crawl, Gary had sex with Sam in a pub toilet. The town residents do not recognise the group, except for one bartender who tells them that they are banned. After Peter encounters Shane Hawkins, his childhood bully who does not seem to remember him, Gary interrupts Peter's account of his torment after going off to buy a round of shots. Angry and upset at the group after they admonish him for his childishness, stubbornness and selective memory, Gary goes to the toilet, where he gets into a fight with a teenager and knocks his head off, exposing him as an android. As Gary's friends find him in the toilet to confront him over lying about his mother's death, the other members of the teen's gang, all androids, enter the toilet and engage in a battle against the human friends. The group realises that most of the town has been replaced with androids (which they dub "Blanks"), explaining why no one remembers them. Shocked and overwhelmed, Andy starts drinking again.

Gary urges them to continue the pub crawl to avoid suspicion, which the rest of the group agree to only because of Gary's stubbornness. The group bumps into Sam once more. Sam, Gary, and Steven fight Blank versions of Sam's childhood friends, known as the "twins". Sam tags along with them, and Steven is told by Basil, another resident known as an eccentric conspiracy theorist who has not yet been replaced by a Blank, that the Blanks are trying to build a galactic conglomerate and that any humans refusing will be replaced with identical simulants. Sam realises this independently after witnessing someone who she knew died in a motorcycle accident eight years earlier. The Blanks attempt to convince the humans to join their assimilation. Unwilling to lose their humanity and, finding out that both Oliver and their old school teacher, Mr. Shepherd, have been replaced, the group fights a bar full of Blanks. The surviving members of the group realise, after noticing that Oliver's surgically-removed "6"-shaped birth mark had returned, that Blanks cannot replicate scarification, prompting them all, except Gary, to show each other their childhood scars (all of which were in some way caused by Gary).

Gary lets Sam escape Newton Haven by herself; Pete gets captured after attacking Shane's Blank; and when Andy and Steven want to go home, Gary ditches them to finish the Golden Mile alone. Andy and Steven chase after Gary, as does the rest of Newton Haven, and Steven is captured. After being confronted by Andy, Gary reveals his recent suicide attempt and his jealousy of Andy's seemingly fulfilled adult life; Andy reveals that his marriage is troubled. Andy tries to stop Gary from drawing his final pint, but Gary is determined to complete the Mile, believing that it is all he has left.

When Gary pulls the lever to pour himself a pint, the floor lowers into a hidden chamber. A disembodied alien entity, the Network, tells Gary and Andy that the Blank invasion is the first step to humanity joining a galactic community. The Network offers Gary eternal youth if he becomes a Blank, but he refuses and decapitates his Blank self. Along with Andy and Steven, who has survived, Gary demands that humanity be left to its own devices, stating that all but three of Newton Haven residents have been replaced with Blanks, and expressing horror at how humans that have been replaced have been composted. The Network, exasperated, agrees to abandon the invasion. Sam rescues Gary, Andy, and Steven as the town is destroyed, but they are unable to outrun the electromagnetic pulse triggered by the departure of the Network, which deactivates Sam's car. Staring out onto the destruction, Gary tearfully apologises to Andy.

Some time later, Andy relates to other survivors of the pulse that it triggered a worldwide blackout that destroyed all electrical power on Earth, sending humanity back to the Dark Ages and killing an unknown number of humans in the process. The remaining Blanks reactivated a few weeks later and, although they are now independent from the Network, they are mistrusted and shunned by most of the surviving humans. Andy's marriage has recovered, Steven is in a relationship with Sam, and the Blank versions of Peter and Oliver have picked up where their human versions left off. Andy relates that he has no idea what happened to Gary.

In the ruins of Newton Haven, the now-sober Gary enters a pub with the Blank versions of his younger friends and orders water. When the bartender refuses to serve Blanks, Gary leads his friends into a brawl.

Cast 
Simon Pegg as Gary King, an immature alcoholic who brings his childhood friends back together to recreate their youth.
Thomas Law as Young Gary
Nick Frost as Andy Knightley, one of Gary's childhood friends who grew up to be a teetotaling corporate lawyer.
Zachary Bailess as Young Andy
Paddy Considine as Steven Prince, one of Gary's childhood friends who grew up to be an architect
Jasper Levine as Young Steven
Martin Freeman as Oliver "O-Man" Chamberlain, one of Gary's childhood friends who grew up to be an estate agent. His nickname comes from a birthmark on his forehead resembling the number 6, which reminded his friends of the birthmark resembling three sixes that marks the Antichrist in the film The Omen.
Luke Bromley as Young Oliver
Eddie Marsan as Peter Page, one of Gary's childhood friends who grew up to be a car salesman.
James Tarpey as Young Peter
Rosamund Pike as Sam Chamberlain, Oliver's younger sister, whom Gary lusts after and Steven is in love with
Flora Slorach as Young Sam
Pierce Brosnan as Guy Shepherd, Gary's favourite teacher.
Bill Nighy (voice) as The Network, the alien entity responsible for the invasion.
David Bradley as "Mad" Basil, an eccentric local man from Newton Haven.
Darren Boyd as Shane Hawkins, Peter's former bully.
Richard Hadfield as Young Shane
Michael Smiley as Trevor "The Reverend" Green, a drug dealer who sold cannabis to Gary during the 1990 attempt at the Golden Mile and now serves The Network.
Sophie Evans as Becky Salt
Rose Reynolds as Tracy Benson
Reece Shearsmith as a local man
Peter Serafinowicz (uncredited) as Knock, Knock, Ginger Home Owner
Alice Lowe (uncredited) as house buyer
Rafe Spall (uncredited) as house buyer

Development 
The World's End began as a screenplay titled Crawl, about a group of teenagers on a pub crawl, written by Edgar Wright at the age of 21. He later realised the idea could work with adult characters to capture "the bittersweet feeling of returning to your home town and feeling like a stranger". Wright also said he wanted to satirise the "strange homogeneous branding that becomes like a virus", explaining: "This doesn't just extend to pubs, it's the same with cafés and restaurants. If you live in a small town and you move to London, which I did when I was 20, then when you go back out into the other small towns in England you go 'oh my god, it's all the same!' It's like Bodysnatchers: literally our towns are being changed to death."

In an interview for Entertainment Weekly, Pegg told Clark Collis, "People think we choose the genre first every time, and it's not true. We find the stories first. The notion of alienation from your hometown taken to its literal conclusion was how we got to science fiction."

After the story was complete, Wright and Pegg examined a list of real pub names and "tried to make them like tarot cards" to foreshadow the events of the story. Wright explained: "So we said, 'OK this one's the Famous Cock, because this is where Gary is trying to puff up his own importance.' ... We did go through and work out in each one how the pub sign was going to relate."

Production 

Principal photography for The World's End began on 28 September 2012. Filming took place in Hertfordshire, at Elstree Studios and on location in Letchworth Garden City and Welwyn Garden City. Part of the film was also shot at High Wycombe railway station, Buckinghamshire.

All twelve pubs in the film use identical signage on menus and walls, reflecting what Wright called "that fake hand-written chalk" common to modern British pubs. The exteriors of the real pubs were shot at locations in Welwyn Garden City and Letchworth Garden City, with altered signage. Letchworth Garden City railway station received a makeover to become the "Hole in the Wall".
Stunts were coordinated by Brad Allen, of martial arts film director Jackie Chan's team. Wright said: "In Drunken Master, Jackie Chan has to get drunk to fight, but this is more the idea of Dutch courage. You know, when you're kind of drunk and you think 'ah, I can climb up that scaffolding!' Or just that you're impervious to pain. One of the things we talked about is this idea that [the characters] become better fighters the more oiled they get."

The Broadway Cinema, Letchworth, a renovated independent cinema built in the 1930s in the Art Deco style, was used to portray the Mermaid pub. This cinema was also the first outside London to play the film, with a special introduction by Pegg thanking the residents of Letchworth for their help during its making; over 800 viewers watched the film at the cinema on its opening night.

Soundtrack 

The film uses what the New York Posts Kyle Smith called "a brilliant Madchester soundtrack", alternative rock and pop music from the time of the characters' adolescence. Wright explained: "A lot of those songs are ones that really hit me and Simon hard when we were that age... [Gary] is still living by those rules. It's like he decided to take 'Loaded' and 'I'm Free' to heart and thinks the party's never going to end."

The soundtrack for the film was released on 5 August 2013 in the UK and 20 August 2013 in the United States, with the film's score, composed by Steven Price, released on the same day.

The only songs featured in the film that did not make it onto the soundtrack are "The Only One I Know", "Summer's Magic" and "The Only Rhyme That Bites", by The Charlatans, Mark Summers and 808 State respectively. The version of "20 Seconds To Comply" which features in the film is the mix from Silver Bullet's album "Bring Down The Walls No Limit Squad Returns", albeit edited to remove dialogue samples from RoboCop. On the soundtrack album, it is replaced by the Bomb Squad mix (again re-edited to remove the samples). The original soundtrack tributes the song "No Opportunity Necessary, No Experience Needed" by Yes when the young characters reach the hills.

Track list 
In addition to songs featured in the movie, the album also features dialogue snippets. The track list for the soundtrack is as follows:
 "Loaded" (single edit) – Primal Scream (4:21)
 "There's No Other Way" – Blur (3:19)
 Dialogue: "I Put This On a Tape for You" – Simon Pegg and Paddy Considine (0:09)
 "I'm Free" – The Soup Dragons (3:50)
 "Step On" – Happy Mondays (5:14) [Deluxe version bonus track]
 Dialogue: "Was The Music Too Loud?" – Steve Oram and Simon Pegg (0:04) [Deluxe version bonus track]
 "So Young" – Suede (3:37)
 "Old Red Eyes Is Back" – The Beautiful South (3:32) [Deluxe version bonus track]
 Dialogue: "A Humble Taproom" – Simon Pegg and Nick Frost (0:15) [Deluxe version bonus track]
 "Come Home" (Flood mix) – James (3:53) [Deluxe version bonus track]
 "Do You Remember the First Time?" – Pulp (4:22)
 Dialogue: "Welcome" – Simon Pegg (0:04)
 "What You Do to Me" – Teenage Fanclub (1:57)
 "Fools Gold" (single edit) – The Stone Roses (4:15)
 "Get a Life" – Soul II Soul (3:36)
 Dialogue: "We Have Changed" – Nick Frost (0:07)
 "This Is How It Feels" – Inspiral Carpets (3:10) [Deluxe version bonus track]
 "Alabama Song (Whisky Bar)" – The Doors (3:16)
 "Wear Your Love Like Heaven" – Definition of Sound (3:43)
 Dialogue: "This Is What the Kids Want" – Simon Pegg and Martin Freeman (0:07)
 "Step Back in Time" – Kylie Minogue (3:04) [Deluxe version bonus track]
 "Join Our Club" – Saint Etienne (3:15)
 "Here's Where the Story Ends" – The Sundays (3:52)
 Dialogue: "I Hate This Town" – Nick Frost (0:04)
 "20 Seconds to Comply" (World's End Bomb Squad mix re-edit) – Silver Bullet (4:35) [A re-edit of the Album Version mix actually appears in the film.]
 "This Corrosion" (single edit) – The Sisters of Mercy (4:21)
 "Happy Hour" – The Housemartins (2:21)
 Dialogue: "Let's Boo Boo" – Simon Pegg and Paddy Considine (0:24)

Release 

The World's End premiered on 10 July 2013 at Leicester Square in London and was released on 19 July 2013 in the United Kingdom. It was released in the United States on 23 August 2013.

Reception

Box office 
The World's End earned £2,122,288 during its UK opening weekend, losing the top spot to Monsters University. Its weekend grosses were higher than Shaun of the Deads £1.6 million but lower than Hot Fuzzs £5.4 million.

In the United States, the film was released on 23 August and earned $3.5 million on its opening day, outperforming The Mortal Instruments: City of Bones and You're Next. It had the highest per-cinema average out of all films in theatres throughout the country on its opening day. Its opening weekend, the film earned $8,790,237, finishing fourth at the box office behind Lee Daniels' The Butler, We're the Millers, and The Mortal Instruments: City of Bones. This total exceeded box office expectations, which had ranged from $7 million to $8.5 million, and was also the biggest opening weekend for any of the films in the Three Flavours Cornetto trilogy.

Critical reception 
On review aggregator website Rotten Tomatoes, the film has an 89% approval rating, with a weighted average score of 7.40/10, based on 244 reviews. The website's critics consensus reads: "Madcap and heartfelt, Edgar Wright's apocalypse comedy The World's End benefits from the typically hilarious Simon Pegg and Nick Frost, with a plethora of supporting players." On Metacritic, it has a weighted average score of 81 out of 100, based on 45 critics, indicating "universal acclaim". Audiences polled by CinemaScore gave the film an average grade of "B+" on an A+ to F scale.

Chris Nashawaty of Entertainment Weekly gave the film a B+, praising it as "hilarious" and the "best" collaboration of Wright, Pegg and Frost, and saying that "these pint-swilling Peter Pans also know how to work the heart and the brain for belly laughs... The finale is a little too shaggy and silly. But what do you expect after a dozen beers?"

Mark Dinning of Empire magazine gave the film four stars out of five, writing: "Bravely refusing to rigidly adhere to a formula that has been so successful, Wright, Pegg and Frost's Cornetto Trilogy closer has tonal shifts you won't expect, but the same beating heart you've been craving."

Henry Barnes of The Guardian gave the film four stars out of five, writing: "With this final film they've slowed down a bit, grown up a lot. And saved the richest bite until last."

Keith Uhlich of Time Out New York named The World's End the ninth-best film of 2013, praising Pegg's "hilarious and heartbreaking portrait of over-the-hill deadbeatness."

Accolades 
At the 19th Critics' Choice Awards in January 2014, The World's End received two nominations, for Best Actor in a Comedy (for Simon Pegg) and for Best Comedy, but lost to Leonardo DiCaprio and American Hustle, respectively. The film won Best British Film at the 19th Empire Awards held in London in March 2014.

It received nominations for three awards at the 40th Saturn Awards: Best International Film, Best Writing, and Best Actor for Pegg. At the 2014 MTV Movie Awards it received nominations for: Best Fight (for Simon Pegg, Nick Frost, Paddy Considine, Martin Freeman, & Eddie Marsan) & Best Comedic Performance (for Simon Pegg).

See also 
 Index of drinking establishment-related articles

References

External links 

 
 
 
 

2013 films
2013 black comedy films
2010s science fiction comedy films
2010s science fiction horror films
2010s comedy horror films
British black comedy films
British post-apocalyptic films
British science fiction films
American science fiction comedy films
Japanese science fiction comedy films
British horror films
Alien invasions in films
Android (robot) films
Apocalyptic films
American post-apocalyptic films
American dystopian films
Films about alcoholism
Films about beer
Films set in 1990
Films set in 2013
Films set in England
Films shot in Hertfordshire
Big Talk Productions films
Focus Features films
Relativity Media films
Universal Pictures films
Working Title Films films
Films directed by Edgar Wright
Films produced by Eric Fellner
Films produced by Tim Bevan
Films scored by Steven Price
Films with screenplays by Edgar Wright
Films with screenplays by Simon Pegg
2013 comedy films
Films shot in Bedfordshire
Films shot at Elstree Film Studios
2010s English-language films
English-language Japanese films
2010s American films
2010s British films
2010s Japanese films